(The Murder of Caesar), Op. 32, is an opera in one act by Giselher Klebe who also wrote the libretto based on the translation by August Wilhelm von Schlegel of Shakespeare's play Julius Caesar.

It premiered on 20 September 1959 at the Grillo-Theater, Essen, with Gustav König conducting. It is dedicated to the German composer . The opera is scored for piccolo flute; soprano, alto, tenor and baritone saxophones; contrabassoon; bass trumpet; tenor tuba; timpani; piano; cellos; double basses; several tapes. A performance takes about 50 minutes.

Roles
Caesar (baritone)
Mark Antony (baritone)
Publius and Popilius Lena, senators (sprechgesang, spoken role)
Conspirators against Caesar:
Brutus (bariton)
Cassius (tenor buffo)
Casca (bass)
Decius (spoken role)
Metellus Cimber (spoken role)
A soothsayer (bass)
Cinna, a poet (tenor)
People of Rome

Time and Place: Ancient Rome, 15 March 44 BC (Ides of March)

References

External links
Work details, Boosey & Hawkes

Operas
German-language operas
Operas by Giselher Klebe
1959 operas
One-act operas
Operas based on works by William Shakespeare
Operas set in ancient Rome
Operas based on real people
Operas set in Italy
Works based on Julius Caesar (play)
Depictions of Julius Caesar in opera
Cultural depictions of Mark Antony
Cultural depictions of Marcus Junius Brutus